Nakauchi (written: 中内) is a Japanese surname. Notable people with the surname include:

, Japanese businessman
Paul Nakauchi (born 1969), American actor and voice actor

See also
Nakachi

Japanese-language surnames